Charlane Oliver is a nonprofit executive and politician from Tennessee. A member of the Democratic Party, she has represented District 19 in the Tennessee Senate since 2023.

References 

Democratic Party Tennessee state senators
Women state legislators in Tennessee
Living people
Year of birth missing (living people)